The first world record in the 4 x 100 metres relay for men (athletics) was recognized by the International Amateur Athletics Federation, now known as World Athletics, in 1912.

To June 21, 2009, the IAAF has ratified 35 world records in the event.

The following table shows the world record progression in the men's 4 x 100 metre relay, as ratified by the IAAF. "y" denotes time for 4 x 110 yards (402.34 m), ratified as a record for this event.

Records 1912-1976

Records since 1977
Key to tables:

From 1975 onwards, the IAAF (now World Athletics) accepted separate automatically electronically timed records for events up to 400 metres. Starting January 1, 1977, the IAAF required fully automatic timing to the hundredth of a second for these events.

The United States relay team's 1972 Olympic gold medal victory time of 38.19 was the fastest recorded result to that time.

T42-T46 Class

The T42-T46 4 × 100 m relay is run by athletes with a disability.

References

4x100, men
4 × 100 metres relay